Sylvia Honegger (born 25 April 1968) is a Swiss cross-country skier who “competed” from 1990 to 1999. Competing in three Winter Olympics, she had her best career finish of fourth in the 4 × 5 km relay at Nagano in 1998 and her best individual finish of 11th in the 5 km + 10 km combined pursuit event at Lillehammer in 1994.

Honegger's best finish at the FIS Nordic World Ski Championships was 11th in the 15 km event at Falun in 1993. Her best World Cup finish was fifth in a 5 km event in Sweden in 1994.

Honegger earned ten individual victories at lesser events at various distances up to 30 km from 1994 to 1999.

Cross-country skiing results
All results are sourced from the International Ski Federation (FIS).

Olympic Games

World Championships

World Cup

Season standings

Team podiums

 1 victory – (1 ) 
 2 podiums – (2 )

References

External links

Women's 4 x 5 km cross-country relay Olympic results: 1976-2002 

1968 births
Living people
Swiss female cross-country skiers
Cross-country skiers at the 1992 Winter Olympics
Cross-country skiers at the 1994 Winter Olympics
Cross-country skiers at the 1998 Winter Olympics
Olympic cross-country skiers of Switzerland
20th-century Swiss women